Según Bibi is a Mexican sitcom that aired on Las Estrellas from 31 May 2018 to 23 August 2018. Produced by Marisol Mijares and Alex Balassa for Televisa, based on the Argentine series Según Roxi written by Julieta Otero. It stars Gicela Sehedi as the titular character, along with Felipe Nájera, Isabella Vázquez, Ricardo Crespo, and Claudia Cervantes. The first episode of the series was filmed in August 2017.

Plot 
Bibi was a carefree and rock girl who into a mother, she shares her bed with her partner and her four-year-old daughter. Now with her life transformed, she tries not to be the worst mother in the world, work hard, lose weight and be happy.

Cast

Main 
 Gicela Sehedi as Bibi, she is a real estate agent, funny, neurotic, wife without a ring. She knew to be a strong, determined and adventurous woman, but since she is a mother, she drowns in an ibuprofen meter.
 Felipe Nájera as Meme, Bibi's partner and father of Clarita.
 Isabella Vázquez as Clarita, daughter of Bibi and Meme. The little empress of the family.
 Ricardo Crespo as Daniel
 Claudia Cervantes as Ceci

Recurring 
 Mercedes Vaughan as Miss Tita
 Antonio Monroi as Don Beto
 Sonia Couoh as Nancy
 Jimena Guerra as Mami Guerra
 Lorena Del Castillo as Mami Maniqui
 Shakti Urrutia as Mami Tempoz
 Lourdes Gazza as Mami Pedera
 Alejandra Marín as Mami Emprendedora
 Víctor Amaro as Papi Gay Marcelo
 Alejandro Cuétera as Papi Gay Martín
 Isaac Salame as Vendedor de inflables
 Dominika Paleta as Vali

Episodes

References

External links 
 

Las Estrellas original programming
Mexican television sitcoms
2018 Mexican television series debuts
2018 Mexican television series endings
Television series by Televisa
Spanish-language television shows